Steve Ferrone (born 25 April 1950) is an English drummer. He is known as a member of the rock band Tom Petty and the Heartbreakers from 1994 to 2017, replacing original drummer Stan Lynch, and as part of the "classic lineup" of the Average White Band in the 1970s. Ferrone has recorded and performed with Michael Jackson, Eric Clapton, George Harrison, Duran Duran, Stevie Nicks, Laura Pausini, Christine McVie, Rick James, Slash, Chaka Khan, Bee Gees, Scritti Politti, Aerosmith, Al Jarreau, Mick Jagger, Johnny Cash, Todd Rundgren and Pat Metheny.  Ferrone also hosts The New Guy weekly radio show on Sirius Xm's Tom Petty Radio.

Musical career
Ferrone played with the band Bloodstone, appearing on their 1975 album Riddle of the Sphinx. He then began playing with Brian Auger's band Oblivion Express, which had previously featured drummer Robbie McIntosh.

McIntosh later joined the Average White Band and had just released their first number one album when McIntosh died of a heroin overdose. Ferrone was asked to join AWB in his place and stayed with them for the next eight years, recording and playing concert tours to support several hit albums, until AWB broke up in 1982.

Since appearing on Chaka Khan's 1978 debut album, he went on to play on most of her subsequent albums in the 80s, including "Naughty" with former AWB band member Hamish Stuart. In 1985, Ferrone joined the Saturday Night Live house band and was there for the 1985–86 season. He contributed as session drummer for Duran Duran on the Notorious, Duran Duran, and Thank You albums. He also toured with Duran Duran on the Strange Behaviour Tour in support of Notorious. He also toured and recorded with Eric Clapton from 1986 to 1992. During rehearsals in London for the George Harrison tour, he played drums for Duran Duran at Abbey Road Studios and recorded "Ordinary World." In 1991, Ferrone played drums on the George Harrison tour in Japan including three nights at the Tokyo Dome.

Ferrone has also appeared on recordings by Eric Clapton, Bee Gees, Scritti Politti, Brian May, Anita Baker, George Benson, Jonathan Butler, Cyndi Lauper, Bryan Ferry, Climie Fisher, Christine McVie, Peter Frampton, Jeff Golub, Rick James, Whitney Houston, Chaka Khan, Freddie King, Tracy Chapman, Pat Metheny, Marcus Miller, Steve Winwood, Michael W. Smith, Morrissey–Mullen, Dick Morrissey, Jeffrey Osborne, Paul Simon, Alan Frew, Laura Pausini, Bernie Worrell, Al Jarreau, Michael Jackson and Jaco Pastorius.

Ferrone substituted for Joey Kramer of Aerosmith during pre-production of the band's album Nine Lives while Kramer was grieving the loss of his father.

Ferrone met guitarist Mike Campbell of Tom Petty and the Heartbreakers when the two played a show with George Harrison as part of his Hara and the Hijack band at Royal Albert Hall. He became the band's full-time drummer after the departure of original drummer Stan Lynch in 1994. Ferrone's first album with the band was Tom Petty's second solo outing Wildflowers, released that same year. His first live performance as a member of the Heartbreakers was in Louisville, Kentucky on 28 February 1995.

Ferrone thoroughly enjoyed his time with the Heartbreakers, saying that "everyone should have an experience like The Heartbreakers in their musical life: creativity, passion, honesty, integrity and a lot of fun."

In November 2002, Ferrone founded Drumroll Studios in Burbank, California with financial advisor Alan Arora and the help and technical expertise of producer John Jones, with whom he had worked since Duran Duran's "Ordinary World" in 1992. Later, they were joined by guitarist and producer Steve Postell. Together they recorded and produced albums and tracks for a wide variety of musical acts, as well as film and TV scores.

Ferrone released a live solo album titled It Up: Steve Ferrone and Friends Live at La Ve Lee in 2003.

In 2007, he played drums on the self-titled debut album by The Black and White Years, produced by Jerry Harrison of Talking Heads.

In 2010, Ferrone played on the eponymous first solo album by Slash, and joined the Italian band Pooh. He also worked on a collaborative project with composer and musician Eric Alexandrakis, guitarist and composer Warren Cuccurullo, and producer and songwriter Anthony J. Resta. Explaining the purpose of that project in a Modern Drummer news release, Alexandrakis said, "The four of us decided to create a scoring collective to pursue scoring projects in TV themes, film and advertising."
In August 2018 he was announced as drummer for Dire Straits Legacy prior to their first US tour, consisting of 10 dates.

In 2011 Ferrone began playing with old friends Alan Clark and Phil Palmer in a band made up of Dire Straits alumni called The Straits. The band also consisted of Mickey Feat on bass, Chris White on saxophone, Jaimie Squire on keyboards and vocals, and Terrence Reiss on vocals and guitar.

In July 2015, Ferrone reunited with his AWB bandmates Malcolm "Molly" Duncan and Hamish Stuart to form The 360 Band. This is in essence one half of the classic Average White Band lineup. They released an album titled Three Sixty in 2017 and have been performing live together along with supporting musicians.

In 2018, Ferrone played in the house band at a Porsche 70th anniversary event alongside fellow Heartbreaker Benmont Tench, as well as Ian Astbury, Dhani Harrison, and Brian Bell of Weezer

In 2019, Ferrone recorded session drums for Stroke 9's studio album Calafrio.

On 10 July 2019, Ferrone was inducted into the Brighton Music Walk of Fame in his hometown of Brighton, England.

On 1 February 2022, it was announced that Ferrone would be a part of the band for John Mayer's Sob Rock Tour.

Discography 
1974: Live Oblivion Vol. 1 - Brian Auger's Oblivion Express
1974: Straight Ahead - Brian Auger's Oblivion Express
1974: Burglar – Freddie King
1975: Riddle of the Sphinx – Bloodstone
1975: Cut the Cake – Average White Band (AWB)
1976: Soul Searching – AWB
1976: Larger Than Life – Freddie King
1976: Person To Person (live) – AWB
1976: Real Thing – Real Thing
1977: Benny & Us – AWB
1977: Burnin' At The Stake – Domenic Troiano Band
1977: Up – Morrissey–Mullen
1977: The Atlantic Family Live at Montreux
1978: Warmer Communications – AWB
1978: Chaka – Chaka Khan
1978: Roberta Flack - Roberta Flack
1979: Feel No Fret – AWB
1979: Castles in the Air – Felix Cavaliere
1979: Thighs and Whispers - Bette Midler
1980: Naughty – Chaka Khan
1980: Invisible Man's Band – Invisible Man's Band
1980: Shine – AWB
1980: Volume VIII – AWB
1981: What Cha' Gonna Do for Me – Chaka Khan 
1981: Love All the Hurt Away - Aretha Franklin
1982: Cupid's in Fashion – AWB
1982: Changes - Keni Burke
1982: Jeffrey Osborne - Jeffrey Osborne
1982: Chaka Khan – Chaka Khan
1982: Instant Love - Cheryl Lynn
1983: Hearts and Bones - Paul Simon
1983: Stay With Me Tonight - Jeffrey Osborne
1983: In Your Eyes - George Benson
1983: Robbery - Teena Marie
1983: Emergency - Melissa Manchester
1984: I Feel For You – Chaka Khan
1984: Don't Stop - Jeffrey Osborne 
1984: Christine McVie – Christine McVie
1985: Glow – Rick James
1985: Cupid & Psyche 85 – Scritti Politti ("Wood Beez (Pray Like Aretha Franklin)", "Don't Work That Hard" and "Absolute")
1985: She's the Boss - Mick Jagger
1985: Gettin' Away with Murder - Patti Austin
1985: 20/20 - George Benson
1985: Take No Prisoners - Peabo Bryson
1985: Say You Love Me - Jennifer Holliday
1986: Souliloquy – Dick Morrissey
1986: Destiny – Chaka Khan
1986: Notorious – Duran Duran
1986: L Is for Lover − Al Jarreau
1986: One to One - Howard Jones
1986: Good to Go Lover – Gwen Guthrie
1986: Back in the High Life – Steve Winwood ("Freedom Overspill")
1986: Enough Is Enough - Billy Squier
1986: Three Hearts in the Happy Ending Machine - Daryl Hall
1987: Red Hot Rhythm & Blues - Diana Ross
1987: Two Stories – The Williams Brothers
1988: Big Thing - Duran Duran
1988: Oasis - Roberta Flack
1988: Positive - Peabo Bryson
1988: The Corporate World – Gail Ann Dorsey
1988: C.K. – Chaka Khan
1988: More Than Friends – Jonathan Butler
1989: A Night to Remember – Cyndi Lauper
1989: When All the Pieces Fit - Peter Frampton
1989: One – Bee Gees
1989: Cosmic Thing – B52's
1989: Journeyman – Eric Clapton
1989: City Streets - Carole King
1990: I'm Your Baby Tonight - Whitney Houston
1990: Making Every Moment Count - Peter Allen
1990: Composition - Anita Baker
1990: Oltre – Claudio Baglioni
1991: 24 Nights – Eric Clapton
1991: Inside Out – Clive Griffin
1992: Unplugged – Eric Clapton
1992: Road to Freedom - Grayson Hugh
1992: Live in Japan – George Harrison with Eric Clapton and Band
1992: The Right Time - Etta James
1992: The Woman I Am - Chaka Khan
1993: Spin 1ne 2wo – Spin 1ne 2wo
1993: The Wedding Album – Duran Duran
1993: The Sun Don't Lie – Marcus Miller
1993: Tutte Storie – Eros Ramazzotti
1993: Head to Head – Jonathan Butler
1993: Soul on Board – Curt Smith
1993: Taxi - Bryan Ferry
1993: Love Remembers - George Benson
1993: Independence - Lulu
1993: Clive Griffin – Clive Griffin
1994: Wildflowers – Tom Petty
1994: Letters Never Sent - Carly Simon
1994: Hold On – Alan Frew
1994: Mamouna – Bryan Ferry
1994: Rhythm of Love - Anita Baker
1994: That Secret Place - Patti Austin
1995: Playback – Tom Petty and the Heartbreakers
1995: Shadow Man – Sasha Gracanin featuring Mick Taylor
1995: New Beginning – Tracy Chapman
1995: HIStory: Past, Present and Future, Book I - Michael Jackson
1995: Thank You – Duran Duran
1996: Las Cosas Que Vives – Laura Pausini
1996: Unchained – Johnny Cash
1996: I'm Doing Fine - Dan Hill
1996: Sutras - Donovan
1996: Songs and Music from She's the One – Tom Petty and the Heartbreakers
1996: Falling into You - Céline Dion
1998: One Moment in Time – John Jones
1998: Another World - Brian May
1999: Echo – Tom Petty and the Heartbreakers
1999: Breakdown - Melissa Etheridge
1999: Timbre - Sophie B. Hawkins
2001: Trouble in Shangri-La – Stevie Nicks
2002: The Last DJ – Tom Petty and the Heartbreakers
2002: Twisted Angel - LeAnn Rimes
2002: Escapology - Robbie Williams
2003: It Up: Steve Ferrone and Friends Live at La Ve Lee
2003: Dragonfly - Ziggy Marley
2004: Live at Shibuya Public Hall – Tokyo, Japan 1983 — George Duke Band
2004: Freak Out – Chris Catena
2004: In The Meantime – Christine McVie
2004: My Everything - Anita Baker
2004: Peace... Back by Popular Demand – Keb' Mo'
2004: Come As You Are — Mindi Abair
2004: Keep It Simple — Keb' Mo'
2006: More Head – Steve Ferrone's Farm Fur
2006: Fast Man Raider Man - Frank Black
2006: Suitcase — Keb' Mo'
2007: "Zen Blues Quartet" – with Tim Scott, Jeff Young and John March
2008: The Black and White Years – The Black and White Years
2009: black n white album – John Jones
2009: The Live Anthology – Tom Petty and the Heartbreakers
2009  "Zen Blues Quartet, Again and Yet again" with Mike Finnigan, Tim Scott and John March
2010: Slash – Slash
2010: Mojo – Tom Petty and the Heartbreakers
2010: Dove Comincia il Sole – Pooh
2010: I Feel Like Playing – Ronnie Wood
2011: In Your Dreams - Stevie Nicks
2011: Dedicated – A Salute to the 5 Royales - Steve Cropper
2014: Live – Steve Ferrone & Friends
2014: Hypnotic Eye – Tom Petty and the Heartbreakers
2014: Fly Rasta - Ziggy Marley
2015: Today Is Christmas - LeAnn Rimes
2016: Ziggy Marley - Ziggy Marley
2017: Three Sixty - The 360 Band
2017: Bidin' My Time – Chris Hillman
2018: Traces - Steve Perry
2021: Mo'Live – Steve Ferrone & Friends II

References

External links
 Steve Ferrone Official Website
 2015 Audio Interview with Steve Ferrone from the I'd Hit That podcast
 Gretsch Signature Series Drums – Current Artist Profile, Steve Ferrone 
 Steve Ferrone and Friends website

1950 births
Living people
Average White Band members
Black British rock musicians
Duran Duran members
English funk musicians
English people of Sierra Leonean descent
English rock drummers
People from Brighton
Saturday Night Live Band members
Scritti Politti members
Tom Petty and the Heartbreakers members